The 2022–23 Cornell Big Red men's basketball team represent Cornell University in the 2022–23 NCAA Division I men's basketball season. The Big Red, led by sixth-year head coach Brian Earl, play their home games at Newman Arena in Ithaca, New York, as members of the Ivy League.

Previous season
The Big Red finished the 2021–22 season 15–11, 7–7 in Ivy League play to finish in fourth place. They were defeated by Princeton in the quarterfinals of the Ivy League tournament.

Roster

Schedule and results

|-
!colspan=12 style=""| Non-conference regular season

|-
!colspan=12 style=""|Ivy League regular season

|-
!colspan=12 style=| Ivy League Tournament

Sources

References

Cornell Big Red men's basketball seasons
Cornell Big Red
Cornell Big Red men's basketball
Cornell Big Red men's basketball